Goate is a surname. Notable people with the surname include:

Alison Goate, British neuroscientist
William Goate (1836–1901), English Victoria Cross recipient